Boots is a single by KMFDM, featuring a cover of the Nancy Sinatra song "These Boots Are Made for Walkin'". It was the first release by the band after their three-year hiatus.

Track listing

Personnel
Dorona Alberti – vocals (1–3)
Lucia Cifarelli – vocals (4)
Jules Hodgson – guitars (4)
Sascha Konietzko – vocals, programming, guitars (1, 4), bass (4), drums (4)
Bill Rieflin – synthesizer, programming (4)
Tim Skold – programming, bass (1), guitars (1), drums (1)

Production
Producer – Sascha Konietzko
Engineer – Chris Shepard

References

2002 EPs
KMFDM albums